BK Děčín, for sponsorships reasons named BK Armex Děčín, is a Czech professional basketball club based in the city of Děčín. They play in the Czech National Basketball League – the highest competition in the Czech Republic.

History
In 1974, Děčín played in the Czechoslovak Premier League for the first time. The team immediately relegated back to the second league, after one season. In 1993, Děčín promoted to the first tier NBL once again, but this time it stayed there until now.

In 2015, 2016 and 2019, Děčín reached the finals of the NBL. However, it never won a game as it was swept in all series by dominant Basketball Nymburk.

Honours
 National Basketball League
Runner-up (3): 2014–15, 2015–16, 2018–19
Third place (4): 1997–98, 2008–09, 2010–11, 2011–12
Czech Republic Basketball Cup
Runner-up (2): 2015, 2016

Names
Decin Sokol (1945–1960)
Spartak-Karna Děčín (1960–1990)
BK Děčín Locomotive (1990–1995)
BK SCE Děčín (1995–2005)
BK Děčín (2005–2015)
BK Děčín Armex (2015–present)

Roster

External links 
Official Site 
Eurobasket.com BK Decin Page

Decin
Basketball teams established in 1945
Sport in Děčín